Savidava may refer to one of the following:
 Sacidava (Dacia)
 Sacidava (Moesia)
 Sacidava (castra), the Roman fort built near the Getic settlement Sacidava in Moesia